The University of Nordland, (Abbreviation: UIN) previously Bodø University College, was a public university located in Bodø, Norway. In January 2016, the university was merged with Nesna University College and Nord-Trøndelag University College, becoming Nord University.

It offers a wide range of undergraduate and graduate programs in various fields such as arts, humanities, social sciences, natural sciences, technology, education, health, and business. 

UIN has also established several research centers, including the Centre for Sami Studies, the Centre for Rural Research, and the Centre for Age-related Medicine.

Academics
Programmes taught in English:
 Bachelor of Circumpolar Studies
 Bachelor of English
 Bachelor of Science in Biology
 Master in Social Work
 Master of Science in Marine Ecology
 Master of Science in Aquaculture
 Master of Science in Business
 Master of Science in Energy Management
 Master of Science in Sustainable Management

Faculties
Biosciences and Aquaculture
Graduate School of Business
School of Professional Studies
Social Sciences

See also
 Centre for High North Logistics, a business foundation associated with the university.

References

External links
 The University of Nordland website

 
Universities and colleges in Norway
Education in Nordland
Buildings and structures in Bodø
Organisations based in Bodø